Granny Squannit (or Squant) is a mythological figure from Wampanoag folklore. She is the wife of the giant Maushop and can be either a small woodland or sea creature.

Mythology 
According to legend, Granny Squannit is one of the Makiawisug, and healers would often look to her for help or guidance. She is a powerful sorcerer and arguments with her husband are said to cause storms.

References 

Deities of the indigenous peoples of North America